Hydrolaetare is a genus of leptodactylid frogs. These frogs are found in Colombia, French Guiana, Peru, Bolivia, and Brazil.

Species
There are three species in this genus.

References

 
Amphibian genera
Amphibians of South America
Leptodactylinae